Cranmer Hall may refer to:

Cranmer Hall, Durham
Cranmer Hall, Lincolnshire
Cranmer Hall, Norfolk on List of country houses in the United Kingdom

Architectural disambiguation pages